Matthew Hughes VC (1822 – 9 January 1882) was an English recipient of the Victoria Cross, the highest and most prestigious award for gallantry in the face of the enemy that can be awarded to British and Commonwealth forces.

Hughes was approximately 33 years old and a private in 7th Regiment of Foot (now The Royal Regiment of Fusiliers), British Army when, during the Crimean War, he performed the acts that saw him recommended for the VC. The full citation was in the first set of awards of the VC published in the London Gazette on 24 February 1857, and read:

Private Mathew Hughes, 7th Royal Fusiliers, was noticed by Colonel Campbell, 90th Light Infantry, on the 7th June, 1855, at the storming of the Quarries, for twice going for ammunition, under a heavy fire, across the open ground; he also went to the front, and brought in Private John Hampton, who was lying severely wounded; and on the 18th June, 1855, he volunteered to bring in Lieutenant Hobson, 7th Royal Fusiliers, who was lying severely wounded, and, in the act of doing so, was severely wounded himself.

Hughes achieved the rank of sergeant that same year, but was later demoted.

The Medal
His Victoria Cross is on display at the Tower of London in the Royal Fusiliers Museum.

References

Location of grave and VC medal (West Yorkshire)
 

1822 births
1882 deaths
Military personnel from Bradford
Royal Fusiliers soldiers
British Army personnel of the Crimean War
Crimean War recipients of the Victoria Cross
British recipients of the Victoria Cross
British Army recipients of the Victoria Cross
Burials in West Yorkshire